William Foster (1876-1940), was a British architect, the designer of many pubs for the Meux Brewery, including The Red Lion, Chipping Barnet.

References

1876 births
1940 deaths
20th-century British architects
Public house architects